Lepidiolamprologus profundicola is a species of carnivorous, fish-eating cichlid endemic to Lake Tanganyika where it is found in rocky areas, avoiding areas with a sandy substrate, at relatively deeper depths than its congeners.  This species can reach a length of  TL.  It can also be found in the aquarium trade.

References

profundicola
Taxa named by Max Poll
Fish described in 1949
Taxonomy articles created by Polbot